"Dogs Are Talking" is a song by Australian hard rock band the Angels, released in April 1990  as the second single from The Angels ninth studio album Beyond Salvation. The flipside featured tracks from bands who would be touring in support slots in both Australia and New Zealand, The Hurricanes, Baby Animals and The Desert Cats for Australia and Nine Livez and Shihad for New Zealand.

"Dogs Are Talking" peaked at number 11 on the ARIA Charts and it also peaked at number 12 on the Recorded Music NZ.

Track listing 
 Dogs Are Talking (Doc Neeson, Bob Spencer, Richard Brewster, Brent Eccles, James Morley) - 3:23
Australian edition
 Hold On (Demo) - The Hurricanes (Carl Bell, James Bell, Nick Tsalis) - 
 Break My Heart (Baby Animals) (Eddie Parise, Suze DeMarchi) - 4:02
 I Got You / You Got Me (Demo) (The Desert Cats) (Rob Tognoni) -
New Zealand edition
 Live It Up (Demo) - (Nine Livez) (Mike Friedlos, Michael Betts, Harvey Jackson)
 Down Dance - (Shihad) (Jon Toogood, Tom Larkin, Phil Knight, Hamish Laing) - 5:45

Personnel 
The Angels
 Doc Neeson – lead vocals 
 Rick Brewster – lead guitar
 Bob Spencer – rhythm guitar, backing vocals
 James Morley – bass guitar, backing vocals
 Brent Eccles – drums
Production
 Terry Manning - producer (tracks: 1),

Charts

Weekly charts

Year-end charts

Certifications

References 

The Angels (Australian band) songs
1990 singles
1990 songs
Songs written by Doc Neeson
Mushroom Records singles